Agder County Municipality is the democratically elected regional governing administration of Agder county in Norway.

County government
The Agder county council is made up of 49 representatives that are elected every four years. The council essentially acts as a Parliament or legislative body for the county and it meets about six times each year. The council is divided into standing committees and an executive board which meet considerably more often. Both the council and executive board are led by the County Mayor.

County council
The party breakdown of the council is as follows:

References

Agder
County municipalities of Norway
2020 establishments in Norway
Organisations based in Kristiansand